Memorial Hall, immediately north of Harvard Yard in Cambridge, Massachusetts, is an imposing High Victorian Gothic building honoring Harvard men's sacrifices in defense of the Union during the American Civil War"a symbol of Boston's commitment to the Unionist cause and the abolitionist movement in America."

Built on a former playing field known as the Delta, it was described by Henry James as consisting of

James's "three divisions" are known today as (respectively) Sanders Theatre; Annenberg Hall (formerly Alumni Hall or the Great Hall); and Memorial Transept. Beneath Annenberg Hall, Loker Commons offers a number of student facilities.



Conception and construction

Between 1865 and 1868 an alumni "Committee of Fifty" raised $370,000 (equal to one-twelfth of Harvard's entire endowment at the time) toward a new building in memory of Harvard men who had fought for the Union in the American Civil War, particularly the 136 deada "Hall of Alumni in which students and graduates might be inspired by the pictured and sculpted presence of her founders, benefactors, faculty, presidents, and most distinguished sons."
When, about the same time, a $40,000 bequest was received from Charles Sanders (class of 1802) for
"a hall or theatre to be used on [any] public occasion connected with the College, whether literary or festive", a vision was formed of a single building containing a large theater as well as a large open hall, and thus meeting both goals.

A site was found on the "Delta", the triangle bounded by Cambridge, Kirkland, and Quincy Streets.
The project was formally named Memorial Hall in September 1870, and
on October 6 the cornerstone was laid, Oliver Wendell Holmes Sr. composing a hymn for the occasion.

In May 1878 the Committee of Fifty notified the President and Fellows that the project was complete and the premises ready for formal transfer to the university. On July8 the President and Fellows unanimously voted to "accept with profound gratitude this splendid and precious gift."

Architecture and facilities

The building's High Victorian Gothic design, by alumni William Robert Ware and Henry Van Brunt, was selected in a blind competition. A 1907 publication gives dimensions of 305 by 113 feet, with a height of 190 feet at the tower;
a 2012 source gave a height of 195 feet, making it the ninth-tallest building in Cambridge at that time.
Its 1970 National Historic Landmark designation recognized it one of the nation's most dramatic examples of High Victorian Gothic architecture.

A general restoration was carried out between 1987 and 1996.

Annenberg Hall
What was originally known as Alumni Hallnine thousand square feet shaped by massive wooden trusses, walnut paneling, and a blue, stenciled ceilingwas dedicated in 1874.

Originally intended for formal occasions such as alumni dinners, it was almost immediately converted to a dining commons, and was for fifty years the college's main dining hall (charging, in 1884, $3.97 for a month's meals).
In 1893 the Harvard Graduates Magazine described
"the throngs of men who, at one o'clock, are to be seen racing across the yard from Harvard, Boylston, and Sever [Halls], striving to reach [Memorial] Hall ahead of slower competitors for vacant seats at the overtaxed tables".
But "as the center of University life moved south toward the Charles, [the dining commons] became less popular and closed in 1925"
(see Harvard College § House system) after which Alumni Hall saw mostly light use, typically as a venue for dances, banquets, examinations, and the like. In 1934 The New York Times reported that Harvard officials had "at last found a use for Memorial Hall" by siting a rifle range in the basement.

During World War II the Crimson reported<ref
name="Crimson1943">
Services Use Mem Hall for Cal, Drill, Classes, Movies: 70 Year Old Building Was College Center Harvard Crimson. August 24, 1943. Retrieved 2012-11-10.</ref> that "the Great Hall" was being used "in winter-time for the 6 o'clock in the morning calisthenics of the [military] Chaplain's School" (though without explaining why Harvard Divinity students had been singled out for this treatment) and intimated that Stevens Laboratory, in the basement,  "is doing secret work in acoustics."

After extensive renovations, in 1996 the space was renamed Annenberg Hall and supplanted, as the freshmen dining hall, the Harvard Union, which had performed that function during most of the intervening time.

Memorial Transept

The Memorial Transept [] consists of a  gothic vault above a marble floor, with black walnut paneling and stenciled walls, a large stained glass window over each of two exterior doors, andcommemorating the 136 Harvard men who died fighting for the Uniontwenty-eight white tablets,

Confederate deaths are not represented.

Memorial Transept serves as a vestibule for Sanders Theatre.

Sanders Theatre

Sanders Theatre (substantially completed in 1875, but first used for Harvard's 1876 commencement) was inspired by Christopher Wren's Sheldonian Theatre.
Renowned for its acoustics, and one of Harvard's largest classrooms,
Sanders Theatre (capacity 1000) is in great demand for lectures, concerts, ceremonies and conferences.
Winston Churchill, Theodore Roosevelt, Martin Luther King Jr., and Mikhail Gorbachev have spoken there.

Sanders features John La Farge's stained-glass window Athena Tying a Mourning Fillet; statues of James Otis (by Thomas Crawford) and Josiah Quincy III (by William Wetmore Story) flank the stage.
The exterior gables display busts of great orators: Demosthenes, Cicero, John Chrysostom, Jacques-Bénigne Bossuet, William Pitt, 1st Earl of Chatham, Edmund Burke, and Daniel Webster.

Sanders Theatre contributed in an unusual way to the early work of Wallace Sabine, considered the founder of architectural acoustics. In 1895, tasked with improving the dismal acoustical performance of the Fogg Museum's lecture hall, Sabine carried out a series of nocturnal experiments there, using hundreds of seat cushions borrowed from nearby Sanders as sound-absorbent material; his work each night was limited by the requirement that the cushions be returned to Sanders in time for morning lectures there.
The scientific unit of sound absorption, the sabin, is very close to the absorption provided by one Sanders Theatre cushion.

Loker Commons

Beneath Annenberg Hall, Loker Commons offers a student pub, music practice spaces, and other facilities.

Fenestration
Twenty-two stained-glass windows, installed between 1879 and 1902, include several by John La Farge, Louis Comfort Tiffany Studios, Donald MacDonald, Sarah Wyman Whitman, and Charles Mills.

Tower and clock

by 1876, but criticism convinced Van Brunt and Ware to revise it in 1877. In 1897 was added what a 1905 guidebook described as "an enormous [four-faced clock which] detonates the hours in a manner which is by no means conducive to the sleep of the just and the rest of the weary",
and which Kenneth John Conant termed "railroad Gothic".

In 1932 the clock's driving works, and the associated 155-pound (70kg) bell-clapper, were somehow lowered 115 feet (35m) to the ground without attracting attention; visiting Yale students were suspected
but the clapper was never found. Three years later the disappearance of the replacement clapper, under similar circumstances, was rumored to be Yale's revenge for the theft of its mascot, Handsome Dan.

The 1897 tower was destroyed by fire in 1956 and rebuilt, to its 18771897 appearance, in 1996.

Original backdrop to John Harvard statue

The John Harvard statue was originally (1884) installed before Memorial Hall's west façade, but in 1924 it was moved to its current location on the west side of University Hall.

See also
 List of National Historic Landmarks in Massachusetts
 National Register of Historic Places listings in Cambridge, Massachusetts

Notes

References

External links

 Memorial Hall (Harvard University)
 High Victorian Gothic photographs
 Harvard: America's Great University Now Leads the World Life, vol. 10, no. 18 (May 5, 1941), cover, pp. 22, 89–99. Photo caption, p. 95: "In Memorial Hall, a huge Victorian Gothic barn dedicated to Harvard's Civil War dead, the college's Naval R.O.T.C. unit drills."

Harvard University buildings
School buildings completed in 1877
National Historic Landmarks in Cambridge, Massachusetts
Monuments and memorials in Massachusetts
Military monuments and memorials in the United States
University and college buildings on the National Register of Historic Places in Massachusetts
Harvard Square
Theatres in Massachusetts
Concert halls in Massachusetts
Tourist attractions in Cambridge, Massachusetts
National Register of Historic Places in Cambridge, Massachusetts
1877 establishments in Massachusetts